TI–Raleigh was a Dutch professional track cycling and road bicycle racing team between 1972 and 1983. In that decade the team won over 900 races. The team was created and led by Peter Post. In his own cycling career, his nickname was the Six Days Emperor, being a track champion. He also won the 1964 fast edition of Paris–Roubaix. Post was pretty harsh on himself. He had no time to celebrate and was always looking ahead at the next races. That attitude might have been the key to the teams succes.

The team was successful in classics and in stage races. Notable riders included Joop Zoetemelk, Jan Raas, Gerrie Knetemann, Hennie Kuiper, Urs Freuler, Henk Lubberding, René Pijnen, Johan van der Velde and Dietrich Thurau. The team was known for discipline; team time trials were a speciality. The frame-building was overseen by Jan le Grand at Raleigh's SBDU Ilkeston facility.

Team Time Trials
TI–Raleigh was unbeatable in the team time trials of the 1978 to 1982 Tour de France. In those five years, they won eight Tour TTTs. Driving forces in those TTTs were Jan Raas and Gerrie Knetemann, who decided team tactics during the race. They gave directions and changed the order at will. In the last few kilometers before the finish, Raas began to shout and curse in order to wring out every last bit of energy. After the finish, the riders were exhausted, but it was also time to celebrate.

TI–Raleigh had changed its formation tactics, from the traditional double paceline to a single paceline. 1964 Olympic TTT champion Gerben Karstens came up with the idea, when they were faced with a 153 km (95 miles) long TTT in the 1978 Tour. In a single line formation, the riders get more time to recover. The duration of the pull is varied. Strong riders like time trial specialist Bert Oosterbosch should not increase the pace, but rather take longer turns. Stronger and weaker riders are mixed, which keeps a steadier pace. Knetemann could gently pick up the pace, without anyone noticing.

The team had a profound disgust for team members that did not do their utmost to help the team. It was not a problem when you were the weakest link, because in every team there are specialists for the mountain stages that won't be tough time trial riders. However, the team expected every rider to take their turns, until they could no longer keep up the pace. In that situation you'd take a last pull, and drop off the team. The only exception were the General Classement-riders that had to finish in the same time as the team.

When in 1978 Klaus-Peter Thaler could win the yellow jersey if he'd finish with the team, he refused to take his turns and kept last position, which slows the team down. After 30 km in the wheels, Knetemann and Lubberding were fed up with their selfish "team mate". They started to entice him to take over, and even deliberately gapped themselves, in order to shake him off. This didn't help and also slowed down the team. They were told to knock it off, and Thaler did get his career highlight: the yellow jersey.

The 1980 Tour de France had an early TTT. The prologue was the day before, and in the morning the riders had had a stage of 133 km (83 mi). Bert Pronk had jumped ahead, riding in the breakaway. That helped Jan Raas to win the stage. Pronk didn't recuperate fast, and like every TI–Raleigh rider who was not a TT specialist, or had a bad day, he did fear the TTT that afternoon. Pronk followed the team custom of pulling as long as he could, but he dropped off early in the 46 km (29 mi) long race. When your team is one of the last to start, there are not a lot of cars or teams behind you to pull yourself up to. TI–Raleigh won, but went so fast, that Pronk finished outside the time limit. The next TTT, Raas en Kneet decided to start slowly in order to not repeat the disaster, but they did not tell Zoetemelk or Post about it...

Sponsorship
The team was sponsored by British cycling manufacturer Raleigh and Raleigh's holding company Tube Investments (TI). Raleigh's sponsoring goes back at least as far as 1893, when they had given Arthur Augustus Zimmerman two of their bicycles and advertised Zimmy riding them. Over the years, they've sponsored a whole range of cyclists and teams, based in Great Britain, the Netherlands, the United States of America, Switzerland, Canada and Argentina.

Subsponsors were
 Campagnolo, an Italian manufacturer of high-end bicycle components
 Creda, made cooking appliances and showers, was at the time a part of TI
 McGregor could be a sportswear brand

The end of the TI-Raleigh team
At the end of the 1983 season, the TI–Raleigh team split up because of tension between former world champion Jan Raas and team leader Peter Post, with seven cyclists following Post to the new Panasonic team and six cyclists joining Raas on the Kwantum team. Gerrie Knetemann (to Europ Decor) and Johan van der Velde (to Metauro) did not join the division. In the next nine years, the gap and the animosity grew, and it culminated into a breakaway standstill in the Tour de France of 1992. The backlash made perfectly clear that this could not go on. In the middle of the night, in the middle of a French forest, by shimmering torch lights, the men vowed to end the quarrels. The divorce was finally accepted and dealt with.

Notable riders

Joop Zoetemelk
Jan Raas
Peter Post
Hennie Kuiper
Cees Priem
Johan van der Velde
Roy Schuiten
Gerben Karstens
René Pijnen
Dietrich Thurau
Frank Hoste
Peter Winnen
Ludo Peeters
Gerrie Knetemann
Bert Oosterbosch
Gordon Singleton 1982  track
David Lloyd 1973 to 1975
Sid Barras 1974
Brian Jolly 1974

Major wins

1974
 Grand Prix des Nations, Roy Schuiten
  World Champion, Individual Pursuit, Roy Schuiten
 European championship Madison, René Pijnen
 Six Days of Dortmund, René Pijnen 
 Six Days of Rotterdam, René Pijnen  
 Six Days of Berlin, René Pijnen with Roy Schuiten
1975
 Rund um den Henninger-Turm, Roy Schuiten
 World Champion, Individual Pursuit, Roy Schuiten
 Grand Prix des Nations, Roy Schuiten
 Six Days of Bremen, René Pijnen 
 Six Days of Frankfurt am Main, René Pijnen with Günther Haritz
 Six Days of London, René Pijnen with Günther Haritz
 Six Days of Munich, René Pijnen with Günther Haritz
 Six Days of Münster, René Pijnen with Günther Haritz
 Six Days of Zurich,  Günther Haritz
1976
 Tour de Suisse, Hennie Kuiper
 Tour de France: 4 stages (Hennie Kuiper, Gerben Karstens (2), Team time trial)
 European championship Madison, Réne Pijnen with Günther Haritz
 Six Days of Bremen, René Pijnen with Günther Haritz
 Six Days of Münster, René Pijnen with Günther Haritz
 Six Days of Grenoble, Günther Haritz
1977
 Four Days of Dunkirk, Gerrie Knetemann
 Rund um den Henninger-Turm, Gerrie Knetemann
 Tour de France: 8 stages (Dietrich Thurau (5), Gerrie Knetemann (2), Hennie Kuiper); 1st young rider classification (Dietrich Thurau), 1st team classification
 Six Days of Herning, René Pijnen 
 Six Days of Cologne, René Pijnen with Günther Haritz
 Six Days of London, René Pijnen
 Six Days of Rotterdam, René Pijnen
 Six Days of Grenoble, René Pijnen
1978
 Amstel Gold Race, Jan Raas
 Paris–Nice, Gerrie Knetemann
 Paris–Brussels, Jan Raas
 Paris–Tours, Jan Raas
 Tour de Romandie, Johan van der Velde
 Tour de Suisse, Paul Wellens
 World Champion, Elite road, Gerrie Knetemann
 Tour de France: 10 stages (Jan Raas (3), Gerrie Knetemann (2), Paul Wellens, Klaus-Peter Thaler, Hennie Kuiper, Henk Lubberding, team time trial); 7 yellow jerseys (Jan Raas (3), Gerrie Knetemann (2), Klaus-Peter Thaler (2)); 1st (Henk Lubberding) young rider classification
1979
 Amstel Gold Race, Jan Raas
 Tour of Flanders, Jan Raas
 Tour de Suisse, Wilfried Wesemael
 World Champion, Elite Road, Jan Raas
 World Champion, Elite individual pursuit, Bert Oosterbosch
 Tour de France: 6 stages (Gerrie Knetemann (2), team time trial (2), Jan Raas, Leo van Vliet); 1 yellow jersey (Gerrie Knetemann)
1980
  Tour de France, Joop Zoetemelk
 Amstel Gold Race, Jan Raas
 Critérium du Dauphiné Libéré, Johan van der Velde
 Tour de Luxembourg, Bert Oosterbosch
 Gent–Wevelgem, Henk Lubberding
 Tour of Belgium, Gerrie Knetemann
 Tour de France: 11 stages (Jan Raas (3), Joop Zoetemelk (2), 2 x team time trial, Gerrie Knetemann, Bert Oosterbosch, Henk Lubberding, Cees Priem); 11 yellow jerseys (Joop Zoetemelk (10), Gerrie Knetemann); General classification: 1st (Joop Zoetemelk); 1st (Johan van der Velde) young rider classification
1981
 Omloop Het Volk, Jan Raas
 Gent–Wevelgem, Jan Raas
 Paris–Tours, Jan Raas
 Tour of Belgium, Ad Wijnands
 Tour de France: 7 stages (team time trial (2), Ad Wijnands (2), Johan van der Velde (2), Urs Freuler); 4 yellow jerseys (Gerrie Knetemann)
1982
 Amstel Gold Race, Jan Raas
 Paris–Roubaix, Jan Raas
 Gent–Wevelgem, Frank Hoste
 Four Days of Dunkirk, Frank Hoste
 Paris–Brussels, Jacques Hanegraaf
 Rund um den Henninger-Turm, Ludo Peeters
 Tour de France: 6 stages (Gerrie Knetemann (2), Jan Raas, Frank Hoste, Ludo Peeters, team time trial); 1 yellow jersey (Ludo Peeters)

 World Track Championships, Leicester England, Gordon Singleton Gold in Keirin, Silver in Sprint
1983
 Tour of Flanders, Jan Raas
 Gent–Wevelgem, Leo van Vliet
 Four Days of Dunkirk, Leo van Vliet
 Rund um den Henninger-Turm, Ludo Peeters
 Paris–Tours, Ludo Peeters
 Championship of Zurich, Johan van der Velde
 Tour de France: 4 stages (Bert Oosterbosch (2), Peter Winnen, Henk Lubberding); 1st team classification

References

Further reading

External links

Defunct cycling teams based in the Netherlands
Cycling teams based in the Netherlands
Cycling teams established in 1974
Cycling teams disestablished in 1983
1972 establishments in the Netherlands
1983 disestablishments in the Netherlands